Epaphroditus is a New Testament figure appearing as an envoy of the Philippian church to assist the Apostle Paul.

Epaphroditus or Epaphroditos (Ἐπαφρόδιτος, 'beloved-of-Aphrodite') may refer to:

People
Epaphroditus (freedman of Augustus) (1st century BC), failed to prevent the suicide of Cleopatra
Epaphroditus (freedman of Nero) (1st century), failed to prevent the suicide of Nero
Marcus Mettius Epaphroditus (1st century), Ancient Greek grammarian 
Epaphroditus Champion (1756–1834), American politician and land owner
Epaphroditus Marsh (1637–1719), Irish politician 
Epaphroditus Ransom (1798–1859), American politician and justice

Other uses
Epaphroditus (fly), a genus of Asilidae

See also